This is a list of Scatopsidae taxa that occur in the Australian region.

Abbreviations
 Australia
 ACT = Australian Capital Territory
 NSW = New South Wales
 Qld = Queensland
 SA = South Australia
 TAS = Tasmania
 Vic = Victoria
 WA = Western Australia
 NZ = New Zealand
 PNG = Papua New Guinea

Psectrosciarinae

Anapausis
 Anapausis Enderlein, 1912 
 A. apiocybe Cook, 1977 (NSW)
 A. conspicua Cook, 1971 (NSW)
 A. irritata Cook, 1971 (NSW)
 A. stapedifortmis Freeman, 1989 (NZ)
 A. zealandica Freeman, 1989  (NZ)

Psectrosciara
 Psectrosciara Kieffer, 1911 
 P. brevicornis Johannsen, 1946 (Guam)
 P. dapsila Cook, 1971  (WA)
 P. elachys Cook, 1971  (Qld)
 P. minor Cook, 1971  (Vic)
 P. nitida Cook, 1971 (NSW)
 P. novoguiniensis Duda, 1928  (PNG)
 P. rava Cook, 1971  (Qld)

Scatopsinae

Diamphidicus
 Diamphidicus Cook, 1971
 D. australis Cook, 1971 (ACT)

Rhegmoclema
 Rhegmoclema Enderlein, 1912
 R. angustipenne Cook, 1971  (NSW)
 R. bifurcatum Cook, 1971 (NSW)
 R. cerinum Cook, 1971  (WA)
 R. collessi Cook, 1971  (Qld)
 R. hardyi Cook, 1968 (PNG - Bismarck Arch)
 R. hirtipenne Cook, 1971  (NSW)
 R. macrokylum Cook, 1971  (Qld)
 R. madarum Cook, 1971 (Qld)
 R. noscum Cook, 1971 (NSW)
 R. pallidum Cook, 1971 (Qld)
 R. parcum Cook, 1971 (Qld)
 R. pleonasmon Cook, 1971  (Qld)
 R. rarum Cook, 1971  (Qld)
 R. spatulatum Cook, 1971  (Qld, NSW)

Rhegmoclemina
 Rhegmoclemina Enderlein, 1936
 R. batilliformia Cook, 1971 (NSW, SA)
 R. eximia Cook, 1971  (Vic)
 R. teretis Cook, 1971 (ACT, NSW)

Parmaferia
 Parmaferia Cook, 1977
 P. dentata Cook, 1977  (PNG)
 P. pectinata Cook, 1977 (PNG)

Scatopse
 Scatopse Geoffroy, 1762
 S. notata (Linnaeus, 1758) ("Europa", widespread in Australia, subantarctic islands, Nearctic, Neotropics, Palearctic regions)
 S.longipennis Skuse, 1889  (NSW)

Reichertella
 Reichertella Enderlein, 1912
 R. forcipata Cook, 1971 (ACT, NSW, Vic)

Colobostema
 Colobostema Enderlein, 1926
 C. abbreviatum Cook, 1971  (Qld)
 C. albipharsum Cook, 1971  (Qld)
 C. bihastatum Cook, 1971 (ACT, NSW)
 C. caudiculum Cook, 1971 (NSW)
 C. commoni Cook, 1971 (NSW)
 C. cyclum Cook, 1971 (Qld)
 C. dilemmum Cook, 1971  (NSW)
 C. diversum Cook, 1971 (ACT, WA)
 C. diversum diversum Australia (ACT))
 C. diversum wallacei Cook, 1971  (WA))
 C. fumipenne Enderlein, 1926 (PNG)
 C. hirsutum Cook, 1971  (Qld)
 C. metarhamphe Cook, 1971 (NSW, Qld))
 C. nocturnale Cook, 1968 (PNG - Bismarck Arch)
 C. occabipes Cook, 1971 (NSW, Qld)
 C. occidentale Cook, 1971 (WA, ACT)
 C. occidentale occidentale (WA)
 C. occidentale tonnoiri Cook, 1971  (ACT)
 C. paracyclum Cook, 1971 (Vic)
 C. retusum Cook, 1971  (ACT)
 C. rhamphe Cook, 1971  (ACT, NSW, Qld, Vic)
 C. tribulosum Cook, 1971 (Qld)
 C. truncatum Cook, 1971 (Qld, (NSW)

Ferneiella
 Ferneiella Cook, 1974
 F. angusta Cook, 1977  (NSW)

Holoplagia
 Holoplagia Enderlein, 1912
 H. guamensis Johannsen, 1946 (Guam, Hawaiian Islands, Marshall Islands, Micronesia)
 H.parallelinervis Duda, 1928 (PNG)

Hawomersleya
 Hawomersleya Cook, 1971
 H. aptera Womersley, 1942 (SA, ACT)

Swamerdamella
 Swammerdamella Enderlein, 1912
 S. albimana Edwards, 1924 (Fiji, Niue)
 S. araia Cook, 1971 (Qld)
 S. arthmia Cook, 1971 (Tas, ACT)
 S. crenata Cook, 1971 (NSW, ACT)
 S. richmondensis Skuse, 1890 (NSW, Qld)
 S. sessionis Cook, 1971 NSW, ACT)
 S. stenotis Cook, 1971 (NSW, ACT)
 S. therisa Cook, 1971 (Vic, ACT, NSW, SA, Tas)

Coboldia
 Coboldia Melander, 1916
 C. fuscipes Meigen, 1830 ( (ACT, NSW, Qld, SA, Vic, WA, Hawaiian Islands, Norfolk Island, cosmopolitan) (also erroneously as Colboldia)

Rhexoza
 Rhexoza Enderlein, 1936
 R. chelata Cook, 1971  (NSW)
 R. senticosa Cook, 1971  (Qld)

References
 after Australasian/Oceanian Diptera Catalog (google cache)

 List
Flies